Mori Eskandani (born January 29, 1956) is a producer of many American television poker programs such as Poker After Dark, High Stakes Poker, and the National Heads-Up Poker Championship.
Eskandani is a veteran cash game poker player who has amassed several live tournament winnings as well. Mori began his gambling career in the Portland, Oregon area playing card rooms and moved to Las Vegas in the mid 1980s. Mori's first foray into television was in collaboration with Henry Orenstein on Poker Superstars in 2004 as Co-Creator, Tournament Director and Consultant. Since then Mori's Production Company, PokerPROductions, has gone on to produce Poker After Dark, High Stakes Poker, National Heads-Up Poker Championship, Face the Ace, and more. As of 2009, Poker PROductions started producing WSOP Europe and in 2011, the World Series of Poker.

Eskandani was inducted into the Poker Hall of Fame in 2018.

Notes

External links
Mori Eskandani Interview

Living people
American television producers
American poker players
American people of Iranian descent
1956 births
Poker Hall of Fame inductees